KMRZ-FM (106.7 FM) is a radio station licensed to Superior, Wyoming. Carrying a top 40, the station serves the Rock Springs area. The station is owned by Big Thicket Broadcasting Company of Wyoming. Along with other stations in the area, the broadcast tower for KMRZ is located on Aspen Mountain.

History
Though its license was granted on 14 May 2008, the station signed on in July 2008 as KKWY. In August 2008, while off air, the station changed calls to KMRZ. 
The station started airing a Spanish contemporary format, before flipping to contemporary hits.
The call letters KMRZ were previously used for a station in Cheyenne, Wyoming, known now as KGAB. The KKWY calls appeared on KFBU, also in Cheyenne.

References

External links

MRZ
Radio stations established in 2008
Sweetwater County, Wyoming
Contemporary hit radio stations in the United States